Gymnosiphon usambaricus is a species in the plant family Burmanniaceae. It is endangered due to habitat loss with an estimated 2500 mature individuals left. It is native to Kenya and Tanzania, and is found in the leaf litter in evergreen forests.

References

Burmanniaceae
Plants described in 1894